The Children's Healthcare of Atlanta -  Hughes Spalding Children's Hospital is a freestanding, 24-bed, pediatric acute care and outpatient children's hospital located in downtown Atlanta, Georgia. It is affiliated with both the Emory University School of Medicine and the Morehouse School of Medicine, and is a member of the Children's Healthcare of Atlanta system, 1 of 3 of the children's hospitals in the system. The hospital provides comprehensive pediatric specialties and subspecialties to infants, children, teens, and young adults aged 0–21 throughout the Atlanta region.

History 
The Hughes Spalding Children's Hospital originally opened as a private hospital that served African-American patients beginning in 1952, and serving in a variety of functions through 1989. Renamed to the Hughes Spalding Pavilion, it reopened in 1992 as a pediatric hospital. The hospital, now named Children's Healthcare of Atlanta at Hughes Spalding, is owned by Grady Health System and managed by HSOC, Inc., an affiliate of Children's Healthcare of Atlanta. The 2006 merger was facilitated by a $20 million donation by philanthropist Diana Blank.

See also
Grace Towns Hamilton
Children's Healthcare of Atlanta

References

External links 
  Grady Health System
  Children's Healthcare of Atlanta

Hospital buildings completed in 1952
Hospitals in Atlanta
Children's hospitals in the United States
Historically black hospitals in the United States
Hughes Spalding